Campo de Coia was a sporting venue in Coia, Vigo, Spain, which was the home ground of Celta Vigo, and its predecessor Vigo Sporting Club, between 9 February 1908 and December 1928.

On 14 May 1922, it hosted the 1922 Copa del Rey Final between FC Barcelona and Real Unión which FC Barcelona easily won with 5–1.

The last match ever played at Coia was the first-leg of the quarter-finals of the Copa de España, on December 9, 1928, against Real Sociedad. Which ended in a 2–1 win for the local team. They would go on to lose the return leg 3–0 in San Sebastián.

The site is now occupied by a Lidl supermarket, residential housing and a park.

See also
 1922 Copa del Rey
 1928 Copa del Rey

References

External links
Estadios de España 

Defunct football venues in Spain
RC Celta de Vigo
Sports venues completed in 1908
Sports venues demolished in 1928